Jordan Crane (born September 8, 1973) is an American comics creator.

Crane first emerged in 1996 with the anthology NON, which he edited, contributed to, and published.  This anthology combines influences from Art Spiegelman's RAW and newer comics artists. After two more issues of NON, he moved to Massachusetts and began collaborating with the now defunct comics publisher Highwater Books. (There are five issues of NON in total, all including work by Crane.)

He has four graphic novels, The Last Lonely Saturday, Col-Dee,  and The Clouds Above, and Keeping Two.

Crane's The Clouds Above is a fast-paced children's story which follows the adventures of a boy named Simon and his large cat named Jack. They battle angry clouds, peevish birds and elude the grasp of an overbearing teacher, with the effect resonating somewhere between Where the Wild Things Are and The Wizard of Oz.

Crane is currently working on a quarterly comic called Uptight where he presents new short stories and serializes his long-running work Keeping Two. In 2009 Uptight won two Ignatz Awards for "Outstanding Series" and "Outstanding Comic" (for Uptight #3).

References

External links 
 Jordan Crane's site
 The Clouds Above in the New Yorker
 original art by Crane
 Print interview in The Comics Interpreter # 1 Vol. 1
 Lambiek Comiclopedia accessed September 10, 2005

Alternative cartoonists
American comics artists
American comics writers
Living people
1973 births
Ignatz Award winners for Outstanding Series
Ignatz Award winners